Yeltsovka may refer to several places in Russia:

Yeltsovka Airport, near Novosibirsk
Yeltsovka (Ob), a minor tributary of the Ob near Novosibirsk
rural localities in Altai Krai:
Yeltsovka, Shipunovsky District, Altai Krai, a selo in Yeltsovsky Selsoviet of Shipunovsky District
Yeltsovka, Troitsky District, Altai Krai, a selo in Khayryuzovsky Selsoviet of Troitsky District
Yeltsovka, Ust-Kalmansky District, Altai Krai, a selo in Kabanovsky Selsoviet of Ust-Kalmansky District
Yeltsovka, Yeltsovsky District, Altai Krai, a selo in Yeltsovsky Selsoviet of Yeltsovsky District